David Rogers (born 3 February 1892) was an English professional association footballer. He played for Swindon Town and Gillingham between 1920 and 1928, making nearly 200 appearances in the Football League.

References

1892 births
Year of death missing
English footballers
Gillingham F.C. players
Swindon Town F.C. players
Footballers from Stockport
English Football League players
Association football midfielders